John Stuart Blackie FRSE (28 July 1809 – 2 March 1895) was a Scottish scholar and man of letters.

Biography
He was born in Glasgow, on Charlotte Street, the son of Kelso-born banker Alexander Blackie (d.1846) and Helen Stodart. He was educated at the New Academy and afterwards at the Marischal College, in Aberdeen, where his father was manager of the Commercial Bank.

After attending classes at Edinburgh University (1825–1826), Blackie spent three years at Aberdeen as a student of theology. In 1829 he went to Germany, and after studying at Göttingen and Berlin (where he came under the influence of Heeren, Müller, Schleiermacher, Neander and Böckh) he accompanied Bunsen to Italy and Rome. The years spent abroad extinguished his former wish to enter the Church, and at his father's desire he gave himself up to the study of law.

He had already, in 1824, been placed in a lawyer's office, but only remained there six months. By the time he was admitted a member of the Faculty of Advocates (1834) he had acquired a strong love of the classics and a taste for letters in general. A translation of Goethe's Faust, which he published in 1834, met with considerable success, winning the approbation of Carlyle. After a year or two of desultory literary work he was (May 1839) appointed to the newly instituted chair of Humanity (Latin) in the Marischal College.

Difficulties arose in the way of his installation, owing to the action of the Presbytery on his refusing to sign unreservedly the Confession of Faith; but these were eventually overcome, and he took up his duties as professor in November 1841. In the following year he married. From the first his professorial lectures were conspicuous for the unconventional enthusiasm with which he endeavoured to revivify the study of the classics; and his growing reputation, added to the attention excited by a translation of Aeschylus which he published in 1850, led to his appointment in 1852 to the professorship of Greek at Edinburgh University, in succession to George Dunbar, a post which he continued to hold for thirty years.

He was somewhat erratic in his methods, but his lectures were a triumph of influential personality. A journey to Greece in 1853 prompted his essay On the Living Language of the Greeks, a favorite theme of his, especially in his later years; he adopted for himself a modern Greek pronunciation, and before his death he endowed a travelling scholarship to enable students to learn Greek at Athens.

Scottish nationality was another source of enthusiasm with him; and in this connection he displayed real sympathy with highland home life and the grievances of the crofters. The foundation of the Celtic chair at Edinburgh University was mainly due to his efforts. In spite of the many calls upon his time he produced a considerable amount of literary work, usually on classical or Scottish subjects, including some poems and songs of no mean order.

Blackie was a Radical and Scottish nationalist in politics, of a fearlessly independent type; possessed of great conversational powers and general versatility, his picturesque eccentricity made him one of the characters of the Edinburgh of the day, and a well-known figure as be went about in his plaid, worn shepherd-wise, over one shoulder and under the other, wearing a broad-brimmed hat, and carrying a big stick.

In the 1880s and 1890s, he lectured at Oxford on the pronunciation of Greek, and corresponded on the subject with William Hardie. In May 1893, he gave his last lecture at Oxford, but afterwards admitted defeat, stating: "It is utterly in vain here to talk reasonably in the matter of Latin or Greek pronunciation: they are case-hardened in ignorance, prejudice and pedantry".

He died at 9 Douglas Crescent in Edinburgh. He is buried in Dean Cemetery to the north side of the central path in the north section of the original cemetery. His nephew and biographer, Archibald Stodart Walker (1869-1934) is buried with him.

In 1895 a plaque, designed by Robert Lorimer was erected to his memory in St Giles Cathedral.

Publications
All printed by David Douglas.

Lyrical Poems (1860)
Lays of the Highlands and Islands (1872)
Horae Hellenicae (1874)
On Self-Culture, Intellectual, Physical and Moral (1874)
The Wise Men of Greece (1877)
The Wisdom of Goethe (1883)
A Song of Heroes (1890)

Family

Blackie married Elizabeth (known as Eliza) Wyld in 1842. They had no children. She is buried with him.

He was the uncle of Sir Alexander Kennedy.

Gallery

Works
The hymn he wrote on his honeymoon, "Angels holy, high and lowly," has been called his most enduring work.
 Education in Scotland: An Appeal to the Scottish People, on the Improvement of their Scholastic and Academical Institutions, W. Tait, 1846.
 The Pronunciation of Greek: Accent and Quantity, a Philological Inquiry, Sutherland & Knox, 1852.
 Classical Literature in its Relation to the Nineteenth Century and Scottish University Education, Sutherland and Knox, 1852.
 On Beauty: Three Discourses Delivered in the University of Edinburgh, Sutherland and Knox, 1858.
 Homer and the Iliad, Vol. 2, Vol. 3, Vol. 4, Edmonston & Douglas, 1866 [maintaining the unity of the poems. For further information, see the section on Blackie in English translations of Homer].
 War Songs of the Germans, Edmonston and Douglas, 1870.
 Four Phases of Morals: Socrates, Aristotle, Christianity, Utilitarianism, Edmonston and Douglas, 1871.
 On Self-Culture, Edmonston & Douglas, 1874 [particularly recommended by James Wood].
 Horae Hellenicæ, Essays and Discussion on Some Important Points of Greek Philology and Antiquity, Macmillan & Co., 1874.
 Four Phases of Morals: Socrates, Aristotle, Christianity, Utilitarianism, Edmonston and Douglas, 1874.
 The Language and Literature of the Scottish Highlands, Edmonston and Douglas, 1876.
 Songs of Religion and Life, Scribner, Armstrong & Co., 1876.
 The Natural History of Atheism, Scribner, Armstrong & Company, 1878 [1st Pub. 1877].
 The Wise Men of Greece, Macmillan and Company, 1877.
 Lays and Legends of Ancient Greece, William Blackwood & Sons, 1880.
 Faust: A Tragedy, Macmillan & Co., 1880 [second ed.].
 Lay Sermons Charles Scribner's Sons, 1881.
 Altavona; Fact and Fiction From my Life in the Highlands, D. Douglas, 1882.
 The Wisdom of Goethe, William Blackwood & Sons, 1883.
 The Scottish Highlanders and the Land Laws, Chapman and Hall, 1885.
 What does History Teach?: Two Edinburgh Lectures, Macmillan and Co., 1886.
 Life of Robert Burns, Walter Scott, 1888.
 Scottish Song: its Wealth, Wisdom, and Social Significance, W. Blackwood and Sons, 1889.
 A Song of Heroes, William Blackwood & Sons, 1890.
 Essays on Subjects of Moral and Social Interest, David Douglas, 1890.
 Christianity and the Ideal of Humanity, David Douglas, 1893.

Amongst his political writings, may be mentioned:
 On Democracy, Edmonston & Douglas, 1867.
 The Constitutional Association on Forms of Government: A Historical Review and Estimate of the Growth of the Principal Types of Political Organism in Europe, Edmonston and Douglas, 1867.
 Political Tracts, 1868.

Selected articles
 "Prussia in the Nineteenth Century," The Contemporary Review, Vol. XXIX, December 1876/May 1877.
 "The Scot," The Contemporary Review, Vol. XXXIII, August 1878.
 "On a Radical Reform in the Method of Teaching the Classical Languages," The Contemporary Review, Vol. XXXIV, 1879.
 "Landlords and Land Laws," The Contemporary Review, Vol. XXXVII, January/June 1880.
 "Problem of the Homeric Poems," The Contemporary Review, Vol. XXXVIII, July/December 1880.
 "The Philosophy of the Beautiful," The Contemporary Review, Vol. XLIII, January/June, 1883.
 "Scotland Today," The Forum, Vol. V, 1888.
 "The Christianity of the Future," The Forum, Vol. X, 1890.
 "Shakespeare and Modern Greek," The Nineteenth Century, Vol. XXX, July/December, 1891.
 "John Knox," The Contemporary Review, Vol. LXII, August 1892.
 "The Method of Teaching Languages," The Contemporary Review, Vol. LXVII, January/June 1895.
 "Modern Greece," The Forum, March 1897.

Notes

References

  This work in turn cites:
 Anna M. Stoddart, John Stuart Blackie, Vol. 2, W. Blackwood, 1895.
 A. Stodart-Walker, Selected Poems of J. S. Blackie, with an Appreciation, John Macqueen, 1896.
 Howard Angus Kennedy, Professor Blackie, his Sayings and Doings: A Biographical Sketch with Illustrations,  James Clarke, 1895.

Further reading
 
 Oliphant, Margaret (1895). "John Stuart Blackie," Blackwood's Magazine, Vol. 157, pp. 662–664.
 Stodart-Walker, Archibald (1901). The Day-Book of John Stuart Blackie. London: Grant Richards.
 Stodart-Walker, Archibald (1909). The Letters of John Stuart Blackie to His Wife. Edinburgh: William Blackwood & Sons.

External links

 
 
Blackie's Inaugural Lecture on Classical Literature and Scottish University Education in the 19th Century
Blackie's "On the Advancement of Learning in Scotland"
Blackie's "The Scottish Highlanders and the Land Laws: An Historico-Economical Enquiry"

1809 births
1895 deaths
19th-century British journalists
19th-century British male writers
19th-century British translators
19th-century essayists
19th-century Scottish historians
19th-century Scottish writers
Academics of the University of Aberdeen
Academics of the University of Edinburgh
Alumni of the University of Aberdeen
Alumni of the University of Edinburgh
British male essayists
British male journalists
Male biographers
Members of the Faculty of Advocates
New Latin-language poets
Scottish biographers
Scottish essayists
Scottish literary critics
Scottish poets
Scottish political writers
Scottish politicians
Scottish songwriters
Scottish translators
Translators of Homer
Writers from Glasgow